Proustia is a genus of flowering plants in the family Asteraceae, native to South America and the West Indies.

 Species
 Proustia cuneifolia D.Don - Peru, Bolivia
 Proustia ilicifolia Hook. & Arn. - Argentina, Chile
 Proustia pyrifolia DC. - Chile
 Proustia vanillosma C.Wright - Cuba, Dominican Republic, Puerto Rico

 formerly included
see Acourtia Berylsimpsonia Lophopappus Vernonanthura 
 Proustia crassinervis Urb. - Berylsimpsonia crassinervis (Urb.) B.L.Turner
 Proustia cuneata S.F.Blake - Lophopappus blakei Cabrera
 Proustia domingensis Spreng. ex DC. - Vernonanthura buxifolia (Less.) H.Rob.
 Proustia mexicana Lag. ex D.Don - Acourtia humboldtii (Less.) B.L.Turner
 Proustia reticulata Lag. ex D.Don - Acourtia reticulata (Lag. ex D.Don) Reveal & R.M.King

References

Nassauvieae
Asteraceae genera
Taxa named by Mariano Lagasca